Hans Vanwijn (born 15 February 1995) is a Belgian professional basketball player for Nanterre 92 of the LNB Pro A.

Professional career
Vanwijn was named the BLB Young Player of the Year during the 2015–16 season, after averaging 7.2 points and 5.6 rebounds per game for Limburg.

On 14 April 2017, it was announced that Vanwijn transferred to Antwerp Giants, signing a 3-year contract with the club. In the 2018–19 season, he reached the Final Four of the Basketball Champions League with Antwerp. The team ended in the third place.

After the 2019–20 season was cancelled due to the COVID-19 pandemic, Vanwijn decided not to extend his contract with Antwerp.

On July 8, 2021, he has signed with Casademont Zaragoza of the Liga ACB.

On July 1, 2022, he has signed with Nanterre 92 of the LNB Pro A.

International career
Vanwijn has been a member of the Belgian national basketball team since 2017.

Honours
Antwerp Giants
Belgian Cup (2): 2018–19, 2019–20

References

1995 births
Living people
Antwerp Giants players
Basket Zaragoza players
Belgian expatriate basketball people in France
Belgian men's basketball players
JDA Dijon Basket players
Leuven Bears players
Liga ACB players
Limburg United players
Nanterre 92 players
People from Heusden-Zolder
Power forwards (basketball)
Sportspeople from Limburg (Belgium)
21st-century Belgian people